The Summertime Killer (also known as Target Removed) is a 1972 crime film directed, produced and co-written by Antonio Isasi-Isasmendi and starring Christopher Mitchum, Olivia Hussey and Karl Malden.

Plot
A young boy witnesses four mobsters beating his father to death. Twenty years later, he sets out on a quest to eliminate all of the gang members involved in the murder. After killing three of them, Police Captain John Kiley (Karl Malden) informs the mob's boss that an unknown boy has begun killing his mob partners.

Kiley flies to Portugal and begins assembling the pieces of the puzzle. (Kiley and the mob boss had been partners in 1952, but turned to a vicious rivalry from opposing sides of the law.) With the help of a confidential informant, he finds out Raymond Castor (Christopher Mitchum) has kidnapped Alfredi's daughter, Tania (Olivia Hussey). He goes to Spain to find him and he discovers a garage where Raymond works. This sends Kiley to Torrejón, to talk with Raymond's business partner, another mechanic. He finds Raymond's apartment, at the "Torres Blancas" in the Avenida América de Madrid. Raymond's apartment is a treasure of information, but the only personal picture shows Raymond as a young boy on the beach with his parents.

Meanwhile, he and Tania, after a rocky start (she attempts numerous escapes and tries to kill him with a sharpened closet pole), begin to fall in love. On the day he confronts Alfredi, Raymond hesitates to shoot him, and it ends with one of Alfredi's bodyguards shooting Raymond, who steals a motorbike and tries to escape. An accident then kills Alfredi and everyone else.

Raymond returns to his house and finds Police Captain Kiley is there. He is arrested, but just for a short time. Raymond has lost Considerable blood, and Tania takes care of him as best as she can. Kiley lets them both go, but Raymond doesn't understand why. Kiley answers: "You don't have to. Just keep going before I change my mind." They escape, and when Kiley returns to New York, mobsters-Alfredi's bodyguards-kill him.

Cast
 Christopher Mitchum as Raymond Sullivan Castor
 Karl Malden as Captain John Kiley
 Olivia Hussey as Tania Scarlotti
 Claudine Auger as Michèle, Alfredi's Secretary
 Gérard Barray as Tania's Teacher
 Raf Vallone as Alfredi
 Gérard Tichy as Alex
 Jeffrey Tambor as "Sully" Tambor

Home media
Wild East released the film on a limited edition R0 NTSC DVD alongside Confessions of a Police Captain in 2010.

Pop culture
The film's theme "Summertime Killer" by Luis Enríquez Bacalov was used in the Kill Bill, Volume II soundtrack.

External links
 https://www.imdb.com/title/tt0069457/
 http://www.tcm.com/tcmdb/title.jsp?stid=91887&atid=0
 The New York Times Movies

1972 films
1970s crime action films
Spanish crime action films
Films set in the United States
Films set in Spain
English-language Spanish films
Films directed by Antonio Isasi-Isasmendi
Films scored by Luis Bacalov
Embassy Pictures films
1970s English-language films